Xavier Musca (born 23 February 1960 in Bastia, Corsica) is a French economist, writer, and public administrator. In February 2011, he was appointed the Secretary-General of the French President Nicolas Sarkozy and was in charge of economic affairs. He served as a deputy for two years.

Education
 Institut d'Etudes Politiques de Paris (IEP)
 École nationale d'administration (ÉNA), "Léonard de Vinci" class (1985).

Positions
1985 - Auditor, Inspection Générale des Finances 
1988 - 1989  Adviser to the head of the Inspection Générale des Finances
1989 - 1990  Special adviser, Bureau for Energy, Transportation and Mines, charged with the FDES (economic and social development fund) secretariat at the Treasury Directorate
1990 - 1993  Head of the European Affairs Bureau at the Treasury Directorate
1993 - 1995  Technical adviser for Financial Affairs and International Economic Issues in the Private Office of Prime Minister Edouard Balladur.
1995 - 1996  Head of the Financial Market Bureau at the Treasury Directorate
1996 - 2000  Deputy Director for Europe and Monetary and International Affairs at the European and International Affairs Division of the Treasury Directorate
2000  Chargé de la sous-Direction du financement de l'économie et Head of the Division for the Financing of the Economy and Business Competitiveness, and subsequently Deputy Director
Member of the plenary group of the Euro Taskforce
2001 - May 2002  Head of the Department for the Financing of the State and the Economy at the Treasury Directorate
May 2002 - June 2004  Principal Private Secretary to Francis Mer, Minister of the Economy, Finance and Industry
June 2005 - February 2009  Director General of the Treasury and Economic Policy and President of the Paris Club, a group of finance officials from 19 of the world's richest countries
February 2009 - Deputy Secretary General of the French President's Office
February 2011 - Appointed Secretary General

Career in the private sector
 Amundi, Member of the Board of Directors (since 2016)
 Capgemini, Independent Member of the Board of Directors (since 2014)
 Banco Espírito Santo, Non-Executive Member of the Board of Directors (since 2012)
 CNP Assurances, Member of the Board of Directors (since 2007)

Works
Code monétaire et financier, Alice Pezard and Xavier Musca ; Ed. Litec (2005) ; 
Rapport Moral sur l'Argent dans le Monde, Hubert Martini, Dominica Deprée, Joanne Klein-Cornede, and Xavier Musca; Association d'Economie Financière (2006) ;

References

External links
Chairman's Biography on the Paris Club website. 

1960 births
Living people
French economists
French civil servants
Sciences Po alumni
École nationale d'administration alumni
Inspection générale des finances (France)
Public administration scholars
Chevaliers of the Légion d'honneur
Knights of the Ordre national du Mérite
People from Bastia